The Rag Man is a 1925 American comedy-drama film starring Jackie Coogan. The film was directed by Edward F. Cline, and written by Willard Mack. This was the first Jackie Coogan movie made entirely under the MGM banner.

Plot

Tim Kelly (Jackie Coogan) is a kid who runs away from an orphanage on the Lower East Side in New York after a fire breaks out. He ends up taking refuge with Max (Max Davidson), a lonely junk man who is down on his luck after being cheated out of a patent fortune by some unscrupulous lawyers. Little Kelly and Max form a partnership in the bottle and rag business, and eventually become close companions.

Cast
 Jackie Coogan as Tim Kelly 
 Max Davidson as Max Ginsberg 
 Lydia Yeamans Titus as Mrs. Malloy 
 Robert Edeson as Mr. Bernard
 Ethel Wales as Mrs. Bernard
 William Conklin as Mr. Richard L. Scott

Preservation
A print of The Rag Man is held by MGM.

References

External links

 
 
 
 

1925 films
1920s English-language films
American silent feature films
American black-and-white films
Films about orphans
Metro-Goldwyn-Mayer films
Films directed by Edward F. Cline
1925 comedy-drama films
Surviving American silent films
1920s American films
Silent American comedy-drama films